Hólmfríður "Hófí" Karlsdóttir (born 3 June 1963) is an Icelandic former model and beauty queen who won the 1985 Miss World contest.

Miss World
Hólmfríður finished runner-up at the 1985 Miss Iceland contest behind Halla Jonsdóttir. Halla went to Miss Universe while Hólmfríður won the title of Miss World Iceland and represented Iceland at Miss World, where she was named Europe's Queen of Beauty and Miss World 1985, with Mandy Shires (UK) second and Brenda Denton (USA) third.

Life after Miss World
Hólmfríður is married to Elfar Rúnarsson and they have three children together, Anton Örn Elfarsson ('89), Rúnar Karl Elfarsson ('91) and Ásta Gígja Elfarsdóttir ('97). The family lives in Iceland, Garðabær, where Hófí works in a local kindergarten and Elfar works nearby as a lawyer.

References

Miss World winners
Miss World 1985 delegates
Living people
1963 births
Holmfridur Karlsdottir
Holmfridur Karlsdottir
Holmfridur Karlsdottir